List of rivers of England and Wales may refer to one of:

List of rivers of England
List of rivers of Wales